Finland first participated at the Olympic Games in 1908, and has sent athletes to compete in every Summer Olympic Games and every Winter Olympic Games since then. Finland was also the host nation for the 1952 Summer Olympics in Helsinki. 
Finnish athletes have won a total of 305 medals at the Summer Games, mostly in athletics and wrestling.  Finland has also won 175 medals at the Winter Games, mostly in nordic skiing events.

The National Olympic Committee for Finland is the Finnish Olympic Committee, and was created and recognized in 1907, when Finland was an autonomous part, the Grand Duchy of Finland of the Russian Empire (until 1917). Finland has earned medals at every Olympics since 1908, a feat matched only by Finland's neighboring country Sweden.

Hosted Games
Finland has hosted the Games on one occasion.

Medals

*Purple border color indicates tournament was held on home soil.

Medals by Summer Games
 1908-1912 As  Grand Duchy of Finland

Medals by Winter Games

Medals by Summer Sport

This table does not include the gold medal won in Figure skating at the 1920 Summer Olympics.

Medals by Winter Sport

This table includes the gold medal won in Figure skating at the 1920 Summer Olympics.

Summer\Winter Olympic medalists

Summer Games

Winter Games

Summary by Summer Olympic Sport

Sailing

Summary by Winter Olympic Sport

Alpine skiing

Beginning in 1948, Finland has taken part in alpine skiing in 12 previous Olympic games with a medal record of 1 silver in 2006. In 2010, Finland took part in 7 alpine skiing events with a team of 4, their highest placing being 6th (in women's slalom).

Biathlon

Since biathlon was introduced in the Olympics in 1960, Finland has taken part in the sport in all previous 14 games, with a medal record of 4 silvers and 2 bronzes, latest won in 1998, plus 1 silver from military patrol. In 2010, Finland took part in 6 biathlon events with a team of 4, their highest placing being 41st (in men's sprint).

Bobsleigh

Finland has never participated Olympic bobsleigh.

Cross-country skiing

Finland has taken part in cross country skiing in all previous Winter Olympic Games with a medal record of 19 golds, 22 silvers and 32 bronzes. In 2010, Finland took part in all 12 cross country skiing events with team of 17, winning bronze in women's 30 kilometre classical and 4 × 5 kilometre relay.

Curling

Finland has participated Olympic curling twice, first in 2002, and last in 2006, when they won silver.

Figure skating

Beginning in the 1920 Summer Olympics, Finland has taken part in figure skating in 15 Olympic games with a medal record of 1 gold and 1 silver, latest won in 1924. In 2010, Finland took part in 2 figure skating events with a team of 3, their highest placing being 6th (in ladies' singles).

Freestyle skiing

Since freestyle skiing became an Olympic sport in 1992, Finland has taken part in it in all previous games, with a medal record of 1 gold, 2 silvers and 1 bronze, latest medal won in 2006. In 2010, Finland took part in 2 freestyle skiing events with a team of 4, their highest placing being 14th (in men's moguls).

Ice hockey

Beginning in 1952, Finland has taken part in ice hockey in 15 previous Olympic games, with a medal record of 1 gold, 2 silvers and 5 bronzes.

Luge

Finland has never participated Olympic luge.

Nordic combined

Beginning in the first Winter Olympic games, Finland has taken part in Nordic combined in 20 previous games, with a medal record of 4 golds, 8 silvers and 2 bronzes, latest medal won in 2006. In 2010, Finland took part in all 3 Nordic combined events with a team of 4, their highest placing being 4th (in individual large hill/10 km).

Short track speed skating

Finland has never participated Olympic short track speed skating.

Skeleton

Finland has never participated Olympic skeleton.

Ski jumping

Beginning at the first Winter Olympics, Finland has taken part in ski jumping in 20 previous games, with a medal record of 10 golds, 8 silvers and 4 bronzes, making Finland the most successful ski jumping country up to 2010, latest medals won in 2006. In 2010, Finland took part in all 3 ski jumping events with a team of 5, their highest placing being 4th (in normal hill individual and large hill team).

Snowboarding

Since snowboarding became an Olympic sport in 1998, Finland has participated in it in all previous games, with a medal record of 1 silver and 1 bronze. In 2010, Finland took part in 2 snowboarding events with a team of 5, winning silver in men's halfpipe.

Speed skating

Beginning in the first Olympic Winter Games in 1924, Finland has taken part in speed skating in 20 previous Olympics, with a medal record of 7 golds, 8 silvers and 9 bronzes, latest medal won in 1968. In 2010, Finland took part in 2 speed skating events with a team of 4, their highest placing being 5th (in men's 500 metres).

See also
 :Category:Olympic competitors for Finland
 List of flag bearers for Finland at the Olympics
 Finland at the Paralympics
 Sport in Finland

References

External links
 
 
 

 
Olympics